In molecular biology, the domain B, refers to the immunoglobulin-binding domain found in the Staphylococcus aureus virulence factor protein A (SpA). Hence, it is abbreviated to SpAB.

Function 
SpAB enables theStaphylococcus aureus bacteria to evade  the host's immune system through the disruption of opsonization and phagocytosis. It does this though SpAB binding to  the Fc fragment of IgG.

Structure
The B domain of SpA (SpAB) consists of three a-helices which are retained upon interaction with the Fc fragment of IgG. Protein A contains five highly homologous immunoglobulin (Ig)-binding domains in tandem (designated domains E, D, A, B and C), which share a common structure consisting of three helices in a closed left-handed twist. Protein A can exist in both secreted and membrane-bound forms, and has two distinct Ig-binding activities: each domain can bind Fc-gamma (the constant region of IgG involved in effector functions) and Fab (the Ig fragment responsible for antigen recognition).

The native state of the B domain, deviates a lot since its inter-helical angles fluctuate. It appears to be relatively thermodynamically more stable than the E domain. The increased stability of the B domain may be due to heightened
mobility, and therefore entropy, in the native state and decreased mobility entropy in the more compact denatured state.

References

Protein domains
Virulence factors